Jay Sharrers (born July 3, 1967 in Jamaica and raised in Hope, British Columbia) is a Canadian former ice hockey linesman, and a one-time referee, in the National Hockey League (NHL) who wore uniform number 57.  As of March 2010, Sharrers had officiated 1064 regular season games and 127 playoff games as the first Black NHL referee. Sharrers began in the NHL in 1990 and has worked the Stanley Cup Finals in 1999, 2000, 2006, 2007, 2008, 2011 and 2013 and the 2010 Winter Olympics.

References

1967 births
Living people
Canadian ice hockey officials
Canadian people of Jamaican descent
National Hockey League officials
Ice hockey people from Vancouver